The No Sleep Til Festival was a music festival that was held across Australia and New Zealand in December 2010. The Festival was headlined by Megadeth, who played their album Rust in Peace in its entirety. Other bands included were NOFX, Dropkick Murphys, and Parkway Drive. It also featured legendary punk band Descendents, playing their first Australian shows in their 31-year career.

Lineup & Locations

Locations

The Festival took place in December across 6 cities in Australia and New Zealand.

 Auckland - ASB Showgrounds (10 December)
 Perth - Arena Joondalup (12 December)
 Adelaide - Adelaide Entertainment Centre (15 December)
 Melbourne - Melbourne Showgrounds (17 December)
 Sydney - Entertainment Quarter (18 December)
 Brisbane - RNA Showgrounds (19 December)

Lineup

Appearing at all shows

 Megadeth
 NOFX
 Dropkick Murphys
 Parkway Drive
 GWAR
 Alkaline Trio
 Frenzal Rhomb
 Suicide Silence
 August Burns Red
 Katatonia
 3 Inches of Blood
 We Came as Romans

Appearing in New Zealand only

 Antagonist A.D.
 Leeches
 Outsiders
 Shitripper

Appearing in Australia only

 Me First and the Gimme Gimmes
 House Vs. Hurricane
 Break Even
 Heroes For Hire
 Confession
 A Day To Remember (Adelaide, Melbourne, Sydney & Brisbane only)
 Atreyu (Adelaide, Melbourne, Sydney & Brisbane only)
 Descendents (Melbourne, Sydney & Brisbane only)

References

External links

 http://www.nosleeptil.com.au/

Heavy metal festivals in Australia
Rock festivals in Australia